Lavenham railway station was a station in Lavenham, Suffolk, on the Long Melford–Bury St Edmunds branch line. It closed to passengers in 1961, and the station buildings remained in use as offices until about 2010, when they were demolished.

References

External links
 Lavenham station on navigable 1946 O. S. map
 Lavenham station on Subterranea Britannica

Disused railway stations in Suffolk
Former Great Eastern Railway stations
Railway stations in Great Britain opened in 1865
Railway stations in Great Britain closed in 1961
Lavenham